During the 2006–07 season, Boston United F.C. competed in Football League Two, alongside the FA Cup, Football League Cup and Football League Trophy. The season covered the period from 1 July 2006 to 30 June 2007.

Competitions

League Two

League table

FA Cup 
Boston United's score comes first

League Cup 
Boston United's score comes first

Football League Trophy 
Boston United's score comes first

End of season squad

Left the club

See also

Boston United F.C. seasons
Boston United